Vallabhdas Aidan Mohta (26 April 1933 – 3 July 2018) was an Indian Judge and former Chief Justice of Orissa High Court.

Career
Mohta was born in 1933 at Akola. He studied in New English High School, Akola and passed from DAV College, Kanpur. He completed his LL.B. from Nagpur. Besides legal practice he was involved with lot of social welfare works. Mohta wrote an autobiographical book named Time and Chance. He became the founder president of Radhadevi Goenka Mahila Mahavidyalaya. In 1974, Mohta was elected as Vice Chairman of the Bar Council of Maharashtra. On 27 April 1979 he was appointed a Judge of the Bombay High Court and on 28 September 1994 Mohta was elevated to the post of Chief Justice of Orissa High Court. During his tenure of judgeship he recommended the name of Justice Dipak Mishra, Hon'ble Chief Justice of India.

References

1933 births
2018 deaths
Judges of the Bombay High Court
Chief Justices of the Orissa High Court
20th-century Indian judges
21st-century Indian judges
People from Akola district